Heinrich may refer to:

People 
 Heinrich (given name), a given name (including a list of people with the name)
 Heinrich (surname), a surname (including a list of people with the name) 
Hetty (given name), a given name (including a list of people with the name)

Places 
 Heinrich (crater), a lunar crater
 Heinrich-Hertz-Turm, a telecommunication tower and landmark of Hamburg, Germany

Other uses 
 Heinrich event, a climatic event during the last ice age
 Heinrich (card game), a north German card game
 Heinrich (farmer), participant in the German TV show a Farmer Wants a Wife
 Heinrich Greif Prize, an award of the former East German government
 Heinrich Heine Prize, the name of two different awards
 Heinrich Mann Prize, a literary award given by the Berlin Academy of Art
 Heinrich Tessenow Medal, an architecture prize established in 1963
 Heinrich Wieland Prize, an annual award in the fields of chemistry, biochemistry and physiology
 Heinrich, known as Haida in Japanese versions and the full-episode Netflix series, a character in Aggretsuko

See also 
 Heinrichs
 Henrich
 Henrik